National Route 8 (officially, Ruta Nacional Número 8 "Dr. Blas Garay", simply known as Ruta Ocho) is a highway in Paraguay, which runs from San Estanislao to Coronel Bogado. It mainly connects the north and the south regions of the Oriental Region of Paraguay. It crosses five departments and has a total length of 320 km.

Distances, cities and towns

The following table shows the distances traversed by National Route 8 in each different department, showing cities and towns that it passes by (or near).

8